Odile Bailleux (born 30 December 1939) is a French harpsichordist and organist.

Career 
After she participated in 1964 in the International Academy of the Organ in Saint-Maximin-la-Sainte-Baume, she left in 1969 in Frankfurt to work with the organist Helmut Walcha. She has been teaching the organ since 1989 at the conservatory of Bourg-la-Reine. She is the titular of the Grand Organ of the Notre-Dame-des-Blancs-Manteaux church.

As a harpsichordist she has been performing the continuo in the group Musique-Ensemble and La Grande Écurie et la Chambre du Roy since 1977.

Selected recordings 

 Marc-Antoine Charpentier: Leçons de Ténèbres, H.96, H.97, H.98/108, H.102, H.103, H.109, H.105, H.106, H. 110, H.100 a, Odile Bailleux, organ, La Grande Écurie et La Chambre du Roy conducted by Jean Claude Malgoire. 3 LP CBS 1978.
Marc-Antoine Charpentier: Messe de minuit sur les airs de Noël H.9, Henri Ledroit, John Elwes, Gregory Reinhart, Odile Bailleux, organ,  Les Petits chanteurs de Chaillot, Roger Thirot (chef de choeur), CD CBS, 1982
Marc-Antoine Charpentier: "Vêpres Solennelles" H.540, H.190, H.50, H.149, H.52, H.150, H.51, H.161, H.191, H.65, H.77, John Elwes, Ian Honeyman, tenors, Agnès Mellon, Brigitte Bellamy, sopranos, Dominique Visse, Jean Nirouet, countertenors, Philippe Cantor, Jacques Bona, baritones, Choeur régional- Nord Pas de Calais, La Grande Écurie et la Chambre du Roy, Odile Bailleux, organ, conducted by Jean-Claude Malgoire (2 CD CBS Sony 1987)
Marc-Antoine Charpentier:  Messe à 4 Chœurs H.4, Odile Bailleux, organ, Choeur régional Nord-Pas-de-Calais, La Grande Écurie et La Chambre du Roy, conducted by Jean Claude Malgoire. CD Erato 1991.

Sources

References

External links 
 Odile Bailleux on Discogs
 
 Odile Bailleux à l'orgue de Sète en 1982 (Spanish composers) on YouTube

People from Trappes
1939 births
Living people
French classical organists
French harpsichordists
21st-century organists